Herbert Doussant (born September 7, 1931, New York, New York - died October 29, 2018 in New York, New York) was an American operatic tenor. He sang at major opera houses in Europe and the Americas, appearing in a wide variety of roles from the Italian and German repertoires that ranged from the lyric to the dramatic.

Career

He was originally an insurance agent. He then studied with Douglas Stanley and Paul Weiner in New York, went to Europe and debuted in 1958 at the Municipal Theater of Mainz as Walther von Stolzing in 'Die Meistersinger von Nürnberg'. He remained there until 1960 and then sang at the Stadttheater in Kiel from 1960–63, and at the Stadttheater in Krefeld from 1966-69. He has performed at the Deutsche Oper am Rhein Duesseldorf-Duisburg, at the State Opera of Munich, in Cologne, Nuremberg, Essen, Frankfurt am Main, Hannover, Mannheim and Wiesbaden. In 1961 he worked at the Stadttheater of Kiel in the world premiere of the opera 'Faust III' by Bentzon. He also appeared in Liege, Athens, Bologna and Turin, at the Komische Oper Berlin, in Barcelona, Philadelphia, Honolulu and San Antonio (Texas). In 1964 he appeared in Mexico City as Herod in 'Salome' by R.Straus, 1976 and 1979 at the Opera of Houston / Texas as Othello by Verdi. In his repertoire for the stage were in the first place parts of the heroic tenor subject, including Wagner heroes.
His voice has been described as 'pliant and strong' and 'his sense of the theatric keen'.

Notable Recordings

Wagner: Das Rheingold / Hans Swarowsky, Profil (2013)

References

1931 births
American operatic tenors
2018 deaths
20th-century American male opera singers
Singers from New York City
Classical musicians from New York (state)